Whispers: An Elephant's Tale is a 2000 American adventure film co-written, co-produced and directed by Dereck Joubert and featuring the voice work of Angela Bassett, Joanna Lumley, Anne Archer, Debi Derryberry and Kevin Michael Richardson.

Plot 
The adventures of a baby elephant who was getting used to life in the herd, until the poachers (referred as "takers" by the elephants) separate him from his mother, Gentle Heart (thought to be killed by them), so he runs and gets lost. He is found by a grouchy female named Groove, the sister of an alpha-female named Half Tusk, who walks off disgusted with life in her herd. Not exactly wholehearted, she still takes the orphan under her wing, 'till we find your herd', but fails to find his herd, or a new home with bulls (males) -who find him disrespectful and mouthy- or her own herd, who nickname the kid Whispers since his trumpeting is so weak. Meanwhile the fear for poachers and lions drives them north over the great river, a long and dangerous journey. Groove manages to save Whispers from a pride of lionesses one night.

After a harsh encounter another night with poachers this time, Groove manages to save Whispers from them but ends up fatally wounded in the morning by their gunshots. Whispers is able to find help from Groove's herd. But even the help of Half Tusk cannot save a poor dying Groove, so, Groove tells Whispers to continue the journey with her herd and without her while promising her to look after her herd.

After days of traveling, the elephant herd, with Whispers as the rear guard, finally reach the Great River, but their happiness is later cut short when the same poachers reappear. Whispers finally learns how to trumpet to warn the herd and they manage to give the hunters the slip by swimming in the river and getting to the other side of the river, with the exception of one named Princess, Half Tusk's somewhat spoiled and cynical daughter, who remains behind because of being stuck by a log in the water. Whispers is able to save Princess from the log and a hungry crocodile, then, he and Princess dive underwater while holding their breaths; making the poachers believe that they shot them.

Once the poachers are gone, Whispers and Princess resurface and join the rest of the herd. Half Tusk welcomes Whispers into the family as all the other elephants; including Princess now, accept him as before. Then, Princess notices an elephant on the other side of the river; thinking they "may have left behind", heading their way. Whispers and the herd call out for the new elephant to join them as Whispers trumpets again so as not to let the poachers see her.

Once the elephant reaches them, she asks if Whispers trumpeted like that and he says yes and asks why she is all alone. The elephant then tells him that his trumpet is that of a "strong heart". Whispers recognizes it as something his mother used to tell him and it is finally revealed that the elephant herself is actually his mother, who has been searching for him for a long time and who managed to escape the hunters at the beginning.

With Whispers happily reunited with his mother and both accepted in the elephant herd, they continue to live their lives and Whispers continues to learn more about the outside world as the story comes to end while stating that "it doesn't take the voices of giants to change the world. Sometimes, it can all start with a whisper."

Cast 
 Angela Bassett as Groove
 Joanna Lumley as Half Tusk
 Anne Archer as Gentle Heart
 Debi Derryberry as Whispers
 Kevin Michael Richardson as Adult Whispers
 Kat Cressida as Princess
 Alice Ghostley as Tuskless
 Betty White as Round
 Joan Rivers as Spike
 John DiMaggio as Tough Tusk/Fulla Bull
 Tone Loc as Macho Bull
 Jeannie Elias as Stranger/Herd Elephant
 Harvey Fierstein as Cranky Bull
 Jim Black, Joseph Molekoa, David Mabukane, and Sandor Carter as the Poachers

Production 
Whispers: An Elephant's Tale was filmed in Botswana over a period of 18 months. Only the elephants portraying Whispers and Groove were trained animals. All the other elephants in the film were actually filmed in the wild.

Reception 
Frank Lovece of TV Guide gave the film two out of four star and stated: "Real-life nature photography, rather than the usual trained animal performances, makes up the bulk of this debut fiction film from Dereck and Beverly Joubert, the husband-and-wife deans of wildlife documentary. Yet, despite some remarkable footage, this children's tale of an anthropomorphized young pachyderm searching for his mother contains less originality and emotion than any Babar story.

On review aggregation website Metacritic the film has a score of 30 out of 100, based on reviews from 5 critics, indicating "generally unfavorable reviews".

Home media 
The film was released on VHS and DVD on October 23, 2001 and became available to stream on Disney+ upon the service's launch on November 12, 2019.

References

External links 
 
 
 
 

2000 directorial debut films
2000 films
American children's adventure films
Films about elephants
Films scored by Trevor Rabin
Films set in Africa
Films shot in Botswana
Walt Disney Pictures films
2000s English-language films
2000s American films